Badryash-Aktau (Bäźräş-Aqtaw) is a rural locality (a village) in Voyadinsky Selsoviet, Yanaulsky District, Bashkortostan, Russia. The population was 24 as of 2010. There is 1 street.

Geography 
Badryash-Aktau is located 43 km west of Yanaul (the district's administrative centre) by road. Oshya-Tau is the nearest rural locality.

References 

Rural localities in Yanaulsky District